Emily Craig (born 30 November 1992) is a British lightweight two-time world champion rower.

Rowing career
Craig was part of the British team that topped the medal table at the 2015 World Rowing Championships at Lac d'Aiguebelette in France, where she won a silver medal as part of the lightweight quadruple sculls with Brianna Stubbs, Ruth Walczak and Eleanor Piggott.

At the 2016 World Rowing Championships in Rotterdam, Craig was part of the gold medal-winning team in the women's lightweight quadruple sculls, along with Brianna Stubbs, Eleanor Piggott and Imogen Walsh. She won a bronze medal at the 2019 World Rowing Championships in Ottensheim, Austria as part of the lightweight double sculls with Imogen Grant.

In 2021, she won a European silver medal in the lightweight double sculls in Varese, Italy.

She won a gold medal in the Lightweight Double Sculls at the 2022 European Rowing Championships and the 2022 World Rowing Championships.

References

External links

Emily Craig at British Rowing

Living people
1992 births
British female rowers
World Rowing Championships medalists for Great Britain
People from Pembury
Rowers at the 2020 Summer Olympics
21st-century British women
20th-century British women